The Hound of Rowan (2007) is the first book of the Tapestry Series illustrated and written by American author Henry H. Neff, about a twelve-year-old boy named Max McDaniels who comes across a strange Celtic tapestry one day in a secret room in a museum. Max finds a letter in his coat pocket afterwards that leads him to Rowan Academy, a secret school where other gifted students like him go.

Characters
Max McDaniels is a twelve-year-old boy from Chicago who lives with his father, Scott McDaniels. His mother disappeared a few years prior to the beginning of the book.
David Menlo is Max's roommate at Rowan and one of his close friends.
Nigel Bristow is the recruiter that tests Max prior to attending Rowan.
Gabrielle Richter is the director of Rowan Academy.

Chapters
The Boy, The Train and the Tapestry
Three Soft Knocks
A Time to Choose
The Flight to Rowan
Evils Old and New
The Last Lymrill
A Full House
The New and Weird
A Golden Apple in the Orchard
The Course
All Hallow's Eve
Secret Prisons
Fibs and a Fiddle
Meeting the Vyes
Unexpected Guests
Rowan's New Resident
The Hound of Ulster
Smugglers on the North Atlantic
The Crypt of Marley Augur
Father and Son

Reception
The Hound Of Rowan was nominated for the Texas Bluebonnet Award. Awarded the Missouri Truman Award and Northern California Book of the year.

External links
 Henry H. Neff website
 Publisher Website

2007 fantasy novels
English-language novels
2007 American novels